Mary Jennings Hegar (née von Stein; born March 16, 1976) is an American  United States Air Force veteran and former political candidate. In 2012, she sued the U.S. Air Force to remove the Combat Exclusion Policy. In 2017, she published the memoir Shoot Like a Girl, which describes her service in Afghanistan.

In July 2017, Hegar announced her candidacy for the Democratic nomination for United States House of Representatives to Texas's 31st congressional district. After winning the nomination, she lost to incumbent Republican John Carter by about 3%. She was the Democratic nominee in the 2020 United States Senate election in Texas, losing to incumbent Republican John Cornyn by ten percentage points.

Early life and education 
When Hegar was 7 years old, her mother, Grace, moved her and her sister from Fairfield, Connecticut, to Cedar Park, Texas. Hegar grew up in Cedar Park, where her mother remarried a Vietnam veteran, David Jennings, when she was 10 years old.

Hegar was her high school class president, on the cheer squad, and played various sports, including soccer.

In 1999, Hegar received a BA from the University of Texas at Austin, where she studied criminology, sociology, philosophy, and world religions. While an undergraduate, she was Vice Wing Commander of Detachment 825 AFROTC and Deputy Commander of the Arnold Air Society. In 2015, she graduated from Leadership Austin Essential Class. In 2016 she received an Executive MBA, also from the University of Texas at Austin.

Career

Military 
In December 1999, Hegar was commissioned into the U.S. Air Force through ROTC at the University of Texas. From April 2000 to March 2004, she served on active duty as an aircraft maintenance officer. Initially stationed at Misawa Air Base in Misawa, Aomori, Japan, she was later stationed at Whiteman Air Force Base near Knob Noster, Missouri. At Whiteman, Hegar worked on the F-16 Fighting Falcon and the B-2 Stealth Bomber. Her maintenance career culminated in responsibility for 75% of all B-2 maintenance as a Captain and selection as the Company Grade Officer of the Year for 2003.

In 2004, the Air National Guard selected Hegar for pilot training. Upon completion of her training at the top of her class, she served two deployments to Afghanistan as a HH-60 Pave Hawk helicopter pilot, flying Combat Search and Rescue on over 100 missions as well as Medevac missions as a helicopter pilot. As a member of the California Air National Guard, she worked as a pilot and trainer at the San Jose-based Counterdrug Task Force from 2007 to 2011.

In addition to the deployments to Afghanistan during the Operation Enduring Freedom – Afghanistan, Hegar flew marijuana eradication missions, suppressed wildfires with buckets of water on cargo slings, performed pilot duties in evacuating survivors from hurricane-devastated cities, and rescued civilians on civil search and rescue missions in California and at sea.

On July 29, 2009, on her third tour to Afghanistan, Hegar was shot down near Kandahar with a co-pilot on a combat search-and-rescue mission. She received shrapnel wounds in her arm and leg from Taliban ground fire, but her helicopter was able to rescue the soldiers it had been sent to help. Under further heavy fire, her helicopter was forced to make an emergency landing. Other U.S. Army helicopters rescued her, her team, and the other soldiers, but because the rescue helicopters were small and full, she and others had to fly out standing on the skids.

Hegar was awarded the Purple Heart in December 2009. Her actions on this mission earned her the Distinguished Flying Cross with Valor Device, awarded in 2011. She was one of the few women to receive this medal after Amelia Earhart. In 2016, she described a 2007 mission to medevac a child in great detail in a TEDx Talks presentation.

Due to the restriction of the Combat Exclusion Policy on women applying for ground combat positions, and because she was medically disqualified from flying due to a serious back injury sustained during the 2009 mission, Hegar transitioned out of the Air National Guard and became a Reservist Liaison.

Other work 
In 2010, Hegar relocated to Austin and worked as a program manager at Seton Healthcare Family until 2015. From 2015 to 2017, she worked as a consultant at Dell Computers.

Hegar has taught at the University of Texas at Austin's McCombs School of Business and in the ROTC and women's studies departments. She has mentored cadets at UT and has served on the AFROTC Advisory Committee.

Writing 
In March 2017, the Berkley Books imprint of Penguin Books published Hegar's memoir, Shoot Like a Girl, in a new military division called Caliber. In 2016, it was announced that the movie rights to the book had been optioned by TriStar Pictures, with Angelina Jolie reportedly in negotiations for the lead role.

Politics 
On July 6, 2017, Hegar announced that she would run for the Democratic nomination for U.S. Representative in Texas's 31st congressional district. In May 2018, she won the nomination. In June, Hegar released a short-form political ad, "Doors", that described her military career, including being shot down in Afghanistan. The video went viral and drew the attention of celebrities like Lin-Manuel Miranda. In the November election she lost to Republican incumbent John Carter, who received 50.6% of the vote to her 47.6%; it was Carter's narrowest win in his nine elections to Congress.

On April 23, 2019, Hegar announced that she was running for the Democratic nomination in the 2020 United States Senate election in Texas for the seat held by John Cornyn. She came in first in the March 3, 2020, primary with 22.37% of the vote, and won the July 14 runoff against Texas state Senator Royce West, who had received 14.7% of the primary vote.

Hegar's campaign received the endorsement of former president Barack Obama on September 25, 2020. Her campaign focused on her support for the Affordable Care Act (Obamacare), protecting individuals with preexisting conditions, and creating a public health insurance option. Cornyn won the election, 54% to 44%. Occurring during the 2020's historical high turnout, Hegar received  4,888,764 votes.

Combat Exclusion Policy 
Shortly after the 2009 mission in which Hegar was wounded in Afghanistan, she was medically disqualified from flying. The military's Combat Exclusion Policy automatically excluded her from applying for ground combat positions that would have moved her military career forward. She was barred from cross-training for a ground combat position (such as a special tactics officer) despite her expertise as a pilot, which had it not been for her gender would have been a next step.

In 2012, Hegar was the lead plaintiff alongside former U.S. Marine Corps Captain Zoe Bedell, U.S. Marine Corps First Lieutenant Colleen Farrell, U.S. Army Reserves Staff Sergeant Jennifer Hunt, and the Service Women's Action Network (SWAN) in a lawsuit against U.S. Secretary of Defense Leon Panetta asserting that the Combat Exclusion Policy was unconstitutional. Hegar said the suit was about military effectiveness and would give military commanders a larger pool of applicants. The lawsuit failed, but the policy, implemented in 1994, was repealed in January 2013.

Personal life 
In 2011, Hegar married Brandon Hegar, whom she knew from high school. She and her family live in Round Rock, Texas, a suburb of Austin. She has two sons as well as stepchildren from her husband's previous marriage.

Hegar has many tattoos, which were prominently featured in her 2018 viral campaign ad, "Doors." She has said that the cherry blossom tattoo on her shoulder was a way to cover up shrapnel scar tissue, to take control and make the wounds beautiful. In her book, she mentions being sexually assaulted by an Air Force medic during a physical exam. The ad also discussed the domestic violence perpetrated by her father against her, her mother, and her sister during her adolescent years.

Honors and awards 
 2008: California Aviator of the Year
 2009: Air Force Association, Outstanding Airmen of the Year
 2013: Foreign Policy, The Leading Global Thinkers of 2013 – with Zoe Bedell, Colleen Farrell, and Jennifer Hunt
 2015: Army Women's Foundation Hall of Fame, inductee
 2017: Merrimack College, Honorary PhD of public affairs
 2018: American Red Cross Metro New York North, Exceptional Service Award

Military ribbons

Works and publications 
 
  – in response to retired Army Major General Robert H. Scales opinion piece of 6 Dec 2012 in The Washington Post

References

Further reading 
 
 
 
  – starts at 1:15

External links

 
 
 Hegar et al. v. Hagel at ACLU

1976 births
21st-century American politicians
21st-century American women politicians
United States Air Force personnel of the War in Afghanistan (2001–2021)
Candidates in the 2018 United States elections
Helicopter pilots
Living people
People from Austin, Texas
Texas Democrats
United States Air Force officers
University of Texas alumni
Female officers of the United States Air Force
Women military aviators
People from Cedar Park, Texas
Candidates in the 2020 United States Senate elections
Military personnel from Texas